Trentels-Ladignac is a former railway station in Trentels, Nouvelle-Aquitaine, France. The station is located on the Niversac - Agen railway line. The station is served by TER Nouvelle-Aquitaine bus services on demand to Penne-d'Agenais. Train services were suspended in 2020.

References

Railway stations in France opened in 1863
Defunct railway stations in Lot-et-Garonne